Gwak Kyung-Keun (곽경근; born October 10, 1972) is a South Korean football player who plays at the forward position.

When he transferred to Busan I'cons, he changed his position to defender.

He is now the manager of Bucheon FC 1995 in K League.

References
곽경근 - PENGUIN News 
곽경근, '니포 축구'를 이끈 공격수(상) 
곽경근, '니포 축구'를 이끈 공격수(하)

External links
 
 National Team Player Record 
 
 

1972 births
Living people
Association football forwards
South Korean footballers
South Korean expatriate footballers
South Korea international footballers
Urawa Red Diamonds players
Fukushima FC players
Jeju United FC players
Busan IPark players
J1 League players
Japan Football League (1992–1998) players
K League 1 players
Bucheon FC 1995 managers
Expatriate footballers in Japan
South Korean expatriate sportspeople in Japan
Footballers at the 1992 Summer Olympics
Olympic footballers of South Korea
South Korean football managers
Sportspeople from Gyeonggi Province
Korea University alumni
Hyeonpung Gwak clan